Cytharoclavus is a genus of sea snails, marine gastropod mollusks in the family Horaiclavidae.

It was previously considered a subgenus of the genus Horaiclavus.

References

 Kuroda, T.; Habe, T.; Oyama, K. (1971). The Sea Shells of Sagami Bay. Maruzen Co., Tokyo. xix, 1-741 (Japanese text), 1-489 (English text), 1-51 (Index), pls 1-121

External links
  Bouchet, P.; Kantor, Y. I.; Sysoev, A.; Puillandre, N. (2011). A new operational classification of the Conoidea. Journal of Molluscan Studies. 77, 273-308

 
Horaiclavidae
Gastropod genera